Donald Valentine "Don" Gauf (January 1, 1927 – October 11, 2014) was a Canadian ice hockey player. He was a member of the Edmonton Mercurys that won a gold medal at the 1952 Winter Olympics in Oslo, Norway.

References

External links
bio

1927 births
2014 deaths
Ice hockey people from Edmonton
Ice hockey players at the 1952 Winter Olympics
Medalists at the 1952 Winter Olympics
Olympic gold medalists for Canada
Olympic ice hockey players of Canada
Olympic medalists in ice hockey
Canadian ice hockey defencemen